David Scudamore was the 1997 US Marathon champion.

Palos Verdes High School 
He was the first All-state Cross Country runner from Palos Verdes High School in Palos Verdes, CA in 1987.  Later, he finished in fifth place in the 3200 meters at the 1988 CIF California State Meet.

Leland Stanford University 
Dave is a 2 time All-Pac-10 Academic Honoree at Stanford University in 1990 and 1991.

Professional running 
Later he graduated and ran for the Nike Farm team in Palo Alto, CA. He won the Pittsburgh Marathon in 1997, and in the 2000 United States Olympic Marathon Trials he finished 6th in a world class field. In the 1997 World championship Marathon, he finished 13th overall.

Honors 
After suffering an injury to his achilles in 1995, normally a career ending injury, he came back after surgery to win the National Marathon Championships two years later.  His training of cycles between 120 miles a week and 105 miles a week, never exceeding 25 miles on a long run were considered conservative for a marathoner.  He was named to the Rehab and Sports Medicine Hall of Fame in 2008.

Personal life
His son Harrison finished 13 at the 2017 Foot Locker Cross Country Championships while a senior at Denver East High School.  30 years earlier, David finished 10th in the same race after finishing 15th the year before.

Achievements

References

Living people
American male marathon runners
People from Palos Verdes, California
Year of birth missing (living people)